Ralph Stöckli (born 23 July 1976 in Uzwil) is a Swiss curler from Lucerne.

Stöckli began a successful curling career at the junior level, winning a bronze medal at the World Junior Curling Championships as an alternate in 1994. In 1996, he was the Swiss skip and they won a silver medal, losing to James Dryburgh of Scotland. In 1997 Stöckli won the gold medal defeating Perttu Piilo of Finland in the final. Stöckli ended his junior career with a bronze in 1998.

After a 7th-place finish at the 2002 Ford World Curling Championship, Stöckli won a silver at the 2003 Ford World Curling Championship- losing to Canada's Randy Ferbey in the final.

Stöckli was the skip of the Swiss team at the 2006 Winter Olympics in Turin, Italy. The team finished just out of medal contention with a 5-4 record.

Stöckli was vice on the Swiss team (skipped by Andreas Schwaller) that won the 2006 European Curling Championship.

Stöckli announced his retirement from curling in 2010.

Teammates 

2006 Torino Olympic Games

Claudio Pescia, Third

Pascal Sieber, Second

Marco Battilana, Lead

Simon Strübin, Alternate

2009 Moncton World Championships

2009 Aberdeen European Championships

2010 Vancouver Olympic Games

Jan Hauser, Third

Markus Eggler, Second

Simon Strübin, Lead

Toni Müller, Alternate

Notes

References

External links
 

Swiss male curlers
Curlers at the 2006 Winter Olympics
1976 births
Living people
Olympic curlers of Switzerland
Olympic bronze medalists for Switzerland
Curlers at the 2010 Winter Olympics
Olympic medalists in curling
Medalists at the 2010 Winter Olympics
Sportspeople from the canton of St. Gallen
European curling champions
21st-century Swiss people